The 2005 Samoa National League, or also known as the Upolo First Division, was the 17th edition of the Samoa National League, the top league of the Football Federation Samoa. Tuanaimoto Breeze won their fourth consecutive title, the first under their new name (original name was Strickland Brothers Lepea).

Teams 
 Tuanaimoto Breeze
 Lupe Ole Soaga
 Goldstar Sogi
 Kiwi
 AST Central United
 Moamoa
 Faatoia
 OSM Sinamoga
 Moata'a
 Vaivase-tai

References 

Samoa National League seasons
Samoa
football